Jim Don (11 September 1930 – 26 March 2003) was an Australian rules footballer who played with Hawthorn in the Victorian Football League (VFL).

Don came to Hawthorn from the St Columb's Church of England club. He started 1950 in the Hawthorn thirds, but by round six of the 1950 VFL season had broken into the senior team and made five appearances.

References

1930 births
Australian rules footballers from Victoria (Australia)
Hawthorn Football Club players
2003 deaths